Bernard McGinn may refer to:
Bernard McGinn (theologian) (born 1937), American Roman Catholic theologian
Bernard Henry McGinn (c. 1957–2013), member of the Irish Republican Army